The Marne River, part of the River Murray catchment, is a river that is located in the Barossa Ranges region in the Australian state of South Australia.

Course and features

The Marne flows through Cambrai. The Marne descends  over its  course.

Etymology
In pre-European times, the Ngarrindjeri people used the Marne Valley as a route up into the hills to trade with the Peramangk people in the Barossa Valley and to cut bark canoes from the River Red Gums in the hills which had thicker bark than those near the Murray. The original name of the Marne River was Taingappa, meaning footrack-trading road.

Before 1917, it was called the Rhine River South. Due to anti-German sentiment during World War I, it was renamed after the Marne River of France, where the German advance was stopped in 1914.

See also

Rivers of South Australia

References

Rivers of South Australia
Tributaries of the Murray River